Palacio Barolo is a landmark office building, located at 1370 Avenida de Mayo, in the neighborhood of Montserrat, Buenos Aires, Argentina. It stood as Buenos Aires' tallest building for more than a decade until the construction of the Kavanagh Building in 1936. Its twin brother, Palacio Salvo, is a building designed and erected in Eclectic style, built by the same architect in Montevideo.

This building was declared a national historic monument in 1997. Currently, the building has several travel agencies, a Spanish school for foreigners, a store that sells clothes for tango, offices and studios of architects, accountants, lawyers, and designers.

History
Italian architect Mario Palanti was commissioned to design the building by the empresario Luis Barolo, an Italian immigrant who had arrived in Argentina in 1890 and had made a fortune in knitted fabrics. The basic design, in eclectic style, was conceived simultaneously with one for the Palacio Salvo in Montevideo, Uruguay.

The Palacio Barolo was designed in accordance with the cosmology of Dante's Divine Comedy, motivated by the architect's admiration for Alighieri. There are 22 floors, divided into three "sections". The basement and ground floor represent hell, floors 1-14 are purgatory, and 15-22 represent heaven. The lighthouse at the top of the building can be seen all the way in Montevideo, Uruguay. The owner planned to use only 3 floors, and to rent the rest.
 
When completed in 1923 it was the tallest building, not only in the city, but also in the whole of South America. It remained the city's tallest building until 1935 when, on completion, the Kavanagh Building acquired this distinction. Today it houses mainly lawyers' offices, a Spanish-language school, and a store that sells Tango clothing.

Technical details
The steel-structured skyscraper measures 100 meters and has 22 floors; each floor has a unique design and ornamentation. Staying with the Divine Comedy (in addition to the meter for each canto), the lighted beacon at the top of the building represents the nine choirs of angels. The structure is topped by a small spire with an ornament depicting the Southern Cross constellation. The building is listed in the Emporis database.

The building's foundations conform to the golden ratio. The skyscraper was constructed to house Dante's ashes; Barolo believed "that Europe had begun drifting toward collapse" and wanted to house them as far away as possible from the Continent.

The lobby features a central hall adorned with inscriptions in Latin verse and monster statues. It radiates out from a central dome into nine vaulted archways; these represent the nine circles of hell as described the Inferno. The first three floors have geometric figures representing the alchemical symbols for fire, the colors of the Italian flag, and various Masonic symbols on the walls and floors. The lobby also has operational antiquated elevators.

The lighthouse on the top of the building along with the Palacio Salvo in Montevideo, Uruguay, were designed to serve as a welcome to visitors arriving from the Atlantic Ocean to the Rio de la Plata estuary, similar to the Pillars of Hercules. The ornamental spire aligns with the actual Southern Cross constellation on July 9, Argentine Independence Day.

Gallery

Historical photos

References 
 Mimi Bohm, Buenos Aires, Art Nouveau, Ediciones Xavier Verstraeten, Buenos Aires, 2005.
 Palacio Barolo brochure from a guided tour.

External links

 
 Catalogue of Monuments
 Photo essay of the palace
Monument to the Latin geniuses (in Spanish)

National Historic Monuments of Argentina
Office buildings completed in 1923
Skyscraper office buildings in Argentina
Tourist attractions in Buenos Aires
Works based on the Divine Comedy
Art Nouveau architecture in Buenos Aires
Art Nouveau commercial buildings